The BYD Qin (pronounced "Chin") is a compact sedan developed by BYD Auto, available as an all-electric car, as a plug-in hybrid and as an internal combustion engine vehicle.

The Qin is the successor of the BYD F3DM, the world's first mass-produced plug-in hybrid automobile which launched in China in 2008. In April 2012, BYD announced that due to its low sales, the F3DM was to be replaced by the Qin. The BYD Qin is the plug-in hybrid version of the BYD Surui (the second-generation BYD F3), and was launched in the Chinese market in August 2012. Deliveries in China began in mid December 2013. Retail sales of the BYD Qin began in Costa Rica in November 2013, and BYD planned to start sales in other countries in Central and South America in 2014.

Sales of the plug-in hybrid model in China passed the 50,000 unit milestone in April 2016. From 2014 until mid-2018, the Qin was the all-time top-selling highway legal plug-in passenger car in China. Since inception, cumulative Qin plug-in hybrid sales in China totaled 136,818 units through December 2018 (accounting for both generations of the plug-in hybrid model). The BYD Qin was the top selling plug-in electric car in China in 2014 and 2015, and ranked as the second top selling plug-in hybrid model in 2016. The Qin was the world's second best selling plug-in hybrid car in 2015, and also ranked fifth in 2015 among the world's top selling plug-in electric cars.  , the Qin plug-in hybrid listed sixth among the world's top ten best-selling plug-in electric cars ever. The all-electric variant, the Qin EV300, totaled 10,656 units sold between March and December 2016.

The second generation model includes two variants called the BYD Qin Pro and BYD Qin Plus. The BYD Qin Pro was launched in September 2018, while the BYD Qin Plus was launched in 2021. An updated version of the first generation, known as the "all-new Qin", is sold alongside the second generation Qin variants.

First generation

The BYD Qin concept car was unveiled at the 2012 Beijing International Automotive Exhibition. It was named after the Qin dynasty, China's first imperial dynasty.

At launch, the BYD Qin started at 189,800 rmb before any applicable government subsidies and tax exemptions were available for eco-friendly vehicles. The EV300 starts at 259,800 rmb before incentives.

The Qin was designed with BYD's next-generation, more efficient, dual-mode, electric powertrain. The BYD Qin uses a smaller lithium iron phosphate battery (LiFePO4, or LFP) than its predecessor, the F3DM: 13 kWh instead of 16 kWh. The LiFePO4 battery has a high energy density, can withstand up to 4,000 charges and still retain 80 percent performance, and uses no toxic heavy metals in its manufacture. Due to its improved design, the new battery is about 50 percent smaller and lighter than the one used on the F3DM. BYD said the Qin would be seven percent more efficient with savings in power and energy in all-electric (EV) mode.

Thanks to its smaller battery and increased wheelbase, the Qin will have more interior space than the F3DM, and the styling has also been improved over BYD's earlier models, most notably in the car's interior. The Qin features two large TFT LCD displays on the dashboard, equipped with the BYD "i" intelligent cloud system platform incorporating features like telematics, cloud-computing and a full range of services 24 hours a day.

Pre-facelift styling (2014–2017)

Post-facelift styling (2018)

BYD Qin EV300

A pure battery electric version, the Qin EV300, was released in China in March 2016. There are four versions of the Qin EV300, with pricing ranging between 259,800 and 309,800 rmb, before any applicable government subsidies and tax exemptions. Sales during its first month in the Chinese market totalled 229 units.

Updated model (first generation model based)

Despite the introduction of the Qin Pro in 2018, an updated version of the first-generation Qin is also in production as of 2019. The manufacturer refers to it as the "all-new Qin" (全新秦).

The most obvious styling difference compared to the initial model is the "dragon face" styling of the front end. There are also some changes to the taillights. Since the model is essentially a mid cycle facelift, the side profile, including the shape of the side windows, has not changed much compared to the initial model. The vehicle is actually shorter than the initial model ( vs ), while the wheelbase and the width remain same.

While the initial model was offered as a plug-in hybrid or with an all-electric drivetrain, the updated model is offered with a petrol engine or with an all-electric drivetrain.

Second generation (Pro)

The BYD Qin Pro is the first product of the second generation BYD Qin sedans; it debuted at the 2018 Beijing Auto Show. Initially sold alongside the first generation BYD Qin, it is the first BYD sedan to be designed by BYD's new chief designer, Wolfgang Egger.

BYD's website states that the 2019 Qin Pro will have a "Dragon Face" design of the front grille and a rotating DiLink 12.8 inch touchscreen with artificial intelligence voice interaction system. It will have a suite of advanced safety and driver-assistance systems including an adaptive cruise control system with stop-and-go (ACC-S&G) and an automatic emergency braking system (AEB). High-strength steel comprises 73.5% of the weight of the car's body in white (in the gasoline variant).

Powertrain

BYD offers three different powertrains on the model: the Qin Pro is available as an all-electric car, as a plug-in hybrid and as a conventional gasoline ICE vehicle. Some other models in the company's lineup, including the BYD Song, the BYD Tang and the BYD Song MAX also offer a choice of three different powertrains.

The BYD Qin Pro EV (the all-electric variant) features a  battery in the top version.

The newly launched BYD Qin Pro EV sold 1,003 units in September 2018, its first month on the market.

Second generation (Plus)
For 2021, BYD launched another variant of the Qin called the Qin Plus, based on the same platform as the Qin Pro. The BYD Qin Plus was unveiled during the 2020 Guangzhou Auto Show on November 20, 2020; compared to the Qin Pro, it features restyled front and rear ends, while dimensions are exactly the same as in the Qin Pro. It is available as an all-electric car and as a plug-in hybrid.

Qin Plus DM-i (Plug-in hybrid variant)
Initially, the BYD Qin Plus was only available with a plug-in hybrid powertrain. It is BYD's latest hybrid system called the DM-i. The Qin Plus was one of the first BYD products with the DM-i system to be introduced to the market, alongside the Tang DM-i and Song Plus DM-i crossovers; the market launch event was in January 2021.

The engine's thermal efficiency ratio is claimed to be at the industry-leading 43% as of 2021. Fuel consumption of the Qin Plus does not exceed . Its "blade battery" provides an electric range of 50–120 km. The car is equipped with an E-CVT transmission.

The car's drivetrain was named "cloud-plug-in hybrid" (Xiaoyun-Plug-in hybrid) by the manufacturer.

The 1.5-litre naturally aspirated engine of the Qin Plus DM-i uses the Atkinson cycle and features cooled exhaust gas recirculation (EGR), a split cooling system (the engine cooling circuit is split into two parts, one for the cylinder head and one for the block) and an electric water pump. The compression ratio is 15.5:1 and it meets the National VI B emission standard in China.

Qin Plus EV (all-electric variant)
The top version features a  battery with 600 km range and costs $28,200 (184,620 Chinese yuan) before incentives.

Versions with batteries  are also available, with ranges of  respectively.

Interior
In terms of the interior, the Qin Plus DM-i is equipped with a floating LCD instrument panel and a floating large-size central control screen, combined with a three-spoke flat-bottom multifunction steering wheel.

Production and sales

The BYD Qin was the top selling plug-in electric car in China in 2014 and ranked seventh in 2014 among the world's top ten best selling plug-in cars.

In May 2015, Qin sales passed the 25,000 units milestone to become the seventh plug-in to achieve that mark globally. The BYD Qin was the world's second best selling plug-in hybrid car in 2015 and also ranked fifth in 2015 among the world's top selling plug-in electric cars. Sales of the Qin plug-in hybrid model in China passed the 50,000 unit milestone in April 2016, the sixth plug-in electric car to achieve that mark. , the Qin plug-in hybrid was listed sixth among the world's all-time top ten best-selling plug-in electric cars.

China

After missing the original market launch of August 2013, retail deliveries were rescheduled to begin in Shenzhen in November 2013 and then pushed back until December 2013. The carmaker delayed the launch to coincide with the roll out of local government subsidies for new energy vehicles. Deliveries began in December 2013. Prices started at 189,800 rmb, before a 35,000 rmb central government subsidy available for eco-friendly vehicles, in addition to existing local incentives. The high end trim was priced at 209,800 rmb before incentives.

A total of 142 units were sold in China in December 2013. Sales totalled 14,747 units in 2014, which made the Qin the top selling plug-in electric car in China in 2014 and the all-time top selling plug-in passenger car in the country. In 2015, with 31,898 units sold, the Qin was the top selling plug-in passenger car in China for the second year running and remained the all-time top selling passenger new energy vehicle in China. A total of 21,868 Qins were sold in 2016, which made it the second best-selling plug-in car in the country in 2016 after the BYD Tang. In addition, 10,656 units of the all-electric variant EV300 were sold between March and December 2016.

Sales totaled 20,738 units in 2017 and 47,425 units in 2018. The second generation BYD Qin ProEV was launched in September 2018. The all-electric variant sold a total of 10,527 units in 2018. Since inception, cumulative Qin plug-in hybrid sales in China totaled 136,818 units through December 2018, accounting for both generations of the dual mode (DM) model.

Latin America

BYD planned to begin sales in other Latin American countries in 2014.

See also
 BYD F3DM
 BYD F6DM
 BYD Tang
 Electric car use by country
 Government incentives for plug-in electric vehicles
 History of plug-in hybrids
 List of modern production plug-in electric vehicles
 New energy vehicles in China

References

External links

 BYD Qin official website
 Images of the BYD Qin concept at the 2012 Beijing International Automotive Exhibition 

Qin
Plug-in hybrid vehicles
Partial zero-emissions vehicles
Cars introduced in 2013
Cars introduced in 2018
Sedans
Compact cars
Cars of China
Production electric cars